Eze Harper (born 7 December 1994) is a professional rugby league footballer who plays as a centre or winger for the Barrow Raiders in the Kingstone Press Championship.

Harper signed for Leigh Centurions at the start of the 2016 season but was loaned to Barrow Raiders in Kingstone Press League 1 after only making three appearances in the Championship for the Centurions. During his time with Barrow Harper scored 11 tries in 12 games but was released by Leigh at the end of the season.

In January 2017 it was announced that he would be joining Keighly for the 2017 season. However, days later he opted against signing the contract to join a Championship side. Which was later confirmed to be the Sheffield Eagles.

References

Living people
1994 births
English rugby league players
Rugby league centres
Leigh Leopards players
Barrow Raiders players
Rugby league wingers
Sheffield Eagles players